Dr. Mohammad Ali Modjtahedi Gilani (23 September 1908 – 1 July 1997) was an Iranian University professor and lifetime principal of the highly prestigious Alborz High School in Tehran, Iran.

Founder of Sharif University of Technology (originally Aryamehr Technical University) and dean of Tehran Polytechnic University (currently renamed to Amirkabir University of Technology). Memoirs of Mohammad-Ali Modjtahedi (Persian) 2000 were published as part of Harvard University's Iranian Oral History Project, editor Habib Ladjevardi.

Life
He was born in Lahijan, Gilan in the northern part of Iran. He started his elementary school at the age of seven at Haqiqat school after which he came to Tehran to continue his education at the Dār-ol-Mo'allemin-e Markazi in 1925. He finished high school at Madrese-ye Motavassete in the eastern part of Tehran and received his high school diploma in 1931. In 1932, among 100 other prominent students, he was sent to France for higher education. He completed his undergraduate studies at the Université Lille Nord de France in 1935 and his doctorate at the Paris-Sorbonne University in Mechanical Engineering in 1938.

References

1908 births
1997 deaths
People from Lahijan
People from Gilan Province
Academic staff of Amirkabir University of Technology
University of Paris alumni
Lille University of Science and Technology alumni
Chancellors of the Sharif University of Technology